Love Destiny 2 is a Thai drama series that is currently being filmed. Based on a script by Rompaeng, it is a sequel to the famous novel that was adapted into the television drama Love Destiny, produced by Broadcast Thai Television Co., Ltd., starring Pope Thanavat Vatthanaputi and Bella Ranee Campen. This sequel still has Salya Sukhaniwat as the scriptwriter from the first part.

Initially, Arunocha Panupan, the producer, appointed Mai Phawhat Panangkasiri, the director from the first part, to direct it, but later changed to Saraswati Wongsomphet, the director of Shadow of Love, to take over the role.

The fitting of the actors' clothing was on September 30, 2021, and the buangsuang ceremony on Thursday, November 4, 2021 at Nong Khaem Studio. Saraswati gave an interview with the Bangkokbiz newspaper that 40-50 queues have already been filmed but has to be halted intermittently due to the COVID-19 pandemic.

On Monday, October 10, 2022, the first teaser trailer was released alongside other television series.

References 

Upcoming television series
Thai television soap operas
Television series by Broadcast Thai Television